Actinodaphne quinqueflora (previously Litsea quinqueflora) is a species of plant in the family Lauraceae. It is native to Southern Western Ghats of India and parts of Sri Lanka. Its leaves are simple, alternate; lamina obovate to oblanceolate or elliptic; apex obtuse to acute; base acute to cuneate with entire margin. The flowers show umbel inflorescence, and the fruit is a one-seeded berry. The plant is known as "Wal kos / Kosbada / Landittan - වල් කොස් / ඛොස්බඩ / ලන්දිට්ටන්" by Sinhalese people in Sri Lanka.

References

Flora of India (region)
Flora of Sri Lanka
quinqueflora